Henri-Léon Lévy-Ullmann (1870 – 1947) was a French legal scholar who specialized in comparative law. He was Professor of Civil Law, then Professor of Comparative Law, at the University of Paris, as well as the co-founder of the Paris Institute of Comparative Law. 

During the Interwar period, Lévy-Ullmann worked on the creation of a universally valid "world law of the 20th century", based on studies in comparative jurisprudence.

References 

1870 births
1947 deaths
French legal scholars
Academic staff of the University of Paris
Corresponding Fellows of the British Academy